Luciano Nitrini Guidolin (born October 1972) is a Brazilian businessman, the president and CEO of Odebrecht, a diversified Brazilian conglomerate, which is Latin America's largest construction company, since May 2017.

Early life
Luciano Nitrini Guidolin was born in October 1972. He is a São Paulo native of Italian descent. He has a bachelor's degree in Production Engineering from the Polytechnic School of the University of São Paulo (USP) and an MBA from Harvard University.

Career
In May 2017, Guidolin, a "longtime executive", succeeded Newton de Souza as CEO of Odebrecht.

References

1972 births
Living people
Brazilian chief executives
Odebrecht people
Harvard Business School alumni
University of São Paulo alumni